Ugolino Giugni (died 1470) was a Roman Catholic prelate who served as Bishop of Volterra (1462–1470).

Biography
On 22 March 1462, Ugolino Giugni was appointed during the papacy of Pope Pius II as Bishop of Volterra.
He served as Bishop of Volterra until his death on 25 April 1470.

References 

15th-century Italian Roman Catholic bishops
Bishops appointed by Pope Pius II
1470 deaths